"God Is a DJ" is a song by American singer Pink from her third album, Try This (2003). It was released as the album's second single on November 17, 2003. It is about letting go, loving life and living it to the fullest. It peaked at number six in the Dutch Top 40 and number eleven on the UK Singles Chart. The song appears on the soundtrack of the 2004 film Mean Girls.

Critical response

AllMusic highlighted the song and added that "the echoes of Blur's 'Pressure on Julian' on 'God Is a DJ' are surely coincidental." David Browne was not positive: "we could have done without the dreadful dance-rock cheeseball God Is a DJ." Rolling Stone was not either: "rehashes familiar (Trouble's) themes in 'God Is a DJ': 'I've been the girl, middle finger in the air.' Tell us something we don't know, Pink." Sal Cinquemani was positive: "The shoulda-been first single, 'God Is A DJ,' is filled with the kind of life-affirming dancefloor metaphors that helped send Madge's 'Vogue,' 'Music' and even Pink's own 'Get The Party Started' straight up the charts: 'If God is a DJ/If life is a dancefloor/Love is a rhythm/You are the music.'" Clem Bastow panned the song by noting that "God Is a DJ" is an attempt, unsuccessfully, to recapture some of "P!nk's early-career spunk."

The Village Voice praised the song: "If God were a DJ, which DJ would he be? Paul Oakenfold? Sasha and/or Digweed? No—Larry Levan. They didn't call it the Paradise Garage for nothin'. I ask because 'God Is a DJ,' the obvious and at one time actual choice for lead single off Pink's third album, Try This, goes: 'If God is a DJ/Life is a dance floor/Love is a rhythm/You are the music!' Grandiosity aside—what's Art, then, waving glow sticks?—'God Is a DJ' provides excellent philosophical underpinning for Pink's greatest hit, 'Get the Party Started.'" The same critic added: "Pink revisits her recent career in 'God Is a DJ,' a big-chorused, fast-funk bass-lined spaz-out not written with Armstrong. Loving Mom, hating Dad, pulling her skirt up, sticking her tongue out—it's all here. And it winds up with, 'Look for nirvana/Under the strobe light.' No, not Nirvana, though that comparison flashed before my eyes—before the new Hole was pushed back past Courtney's next court date, I intended to review the two albums together. But it was another major rock chick, Tim Armstrong ex Brody Dalle, who put out the grunge-punk disc of the year, the Distillers' Coral Fang." Dan Leroy was favorable as well: "But if 'God Is A DJ,' he'll put that piece of punky disco perfection, and several other tunes here, in heavy rotation immediately."

Music video
The music video for this song features scenes of Pink and others (assumed to be her roommates) getting dressed, having fun on a subway, and going to a nightclub. Pink then continues to bribe the bouncer (dressed in eccentric drag clothing) to enter the nightclub ahead of the queue.

The video debuted on MTV's Total Request Live at number ten on January 22, 2004, and peaked at number six.

Track listings

UK CD1
 "God Is a DJ" – 3:43
 "Trouble" (Hyper Remix edit) – 3:50

UK CD2 
 "God Is a DJ" – 3:43
 "Trouble" (acoustic version) – 3:01
 "God Is a DJ" (D-Bop Vocal Remix) – 6:36
 "God Is a DJ" (music video) – 3:59European CD1 "God Is a DJ" – 3:43
 "Trouble" (acoustic version) – 3:01European CD2 "God Is a DJ" – 3:43
 "Trouble" (acoustic version) – 3:01
 "God Is a DJ" (D-Bop vocal remix) – 6:36
 "God Is a DJ" (Spider Remix)
 "God Is a DJ" (music video) – 3:59Australian CD "God Is a DJ" – 3:43
 "Trouble" (acoustic version) – 3:01
 "God Is a DJ" (D-Bop vocal remix) – 6:36
 "God Is a DJ" (Spider Remix)iTunes EP'''
 "God Is a DJ" (Spider Dub)
 "God Is a DJ" (D-Bop Remix)
 "God Is a DJ" (Spider Remix)
 "God Is a DJ" (Electroheadz Remix)
 Remixes from Robbie Rivera (Main Vocal Mix, 6:42 & Juicy After Hour Dub Mix, 6:38) and DJ Hyper (7:25) appear on the "Last to Know" single.

Charts

Weekly charts

Year-end charts

Release history

References

2004 singles
Pink (singer) songs
Songs written by Pink (singer)
Songs written by Billy Mann
2003 songs
Arista Records singles
Dance-rock songs
2003 singles